Kārte Naw (New Quarter), historically known as Sayyid Noor Muhammad Shah Meyna (سید نور محمدشاه مینه) is a neighborhood in eastern Afghanistan. It falls under Kabul's District 8. It is mostly a mixed-class residential area with a high number of Pashtuns living there. KARTE-NAW Market is one of popular markets in Afghanistan.

History
Karte Naw was initially developed in the 1950s as an eastern urban expansion from Shah Shahid.

The area was once one of Kabul's most prosperous. However it became a main arena of battle between Mujahideen groups in 1990s that damaged it. The district has been rebuilt since the 2000s.

Postal code
The area's government postal code is 1005.

References

Neighborhoods of Kabul